Alberto Ariel Martínez Piriz (30 July 1950 – 1 December 2009) was an Uruguayan professional footballer who played in Austria for Austria Vienna.

Club career
Martínez, who played as a midfielder, participated in the 1978 European Cup Winners' Cup Final for Austria Vienna. Martínez died on 1 December 2009 of heart failure, at the age of 59.

Personal life
Martínez held Austrian citizenship. His son is the footballer Sebastián Martínez who obtained two international caps for Austria.

References

External links
 
 austria-archiv.at

1950 births
2009 deaths
People from Rocha, Uruguay
Uruguayan footballers
Association football midfielders
Peñarol players
FK Austria Wien players
Austrian Football Bundesliga players
UD Las Palmas players
La Liga players
Uruguayan expatriate footballers
Uruguayan expatriate sportspeople in Austria
Uruguayan expatriate sportspeople in Spain
Expatriate footballers in Austria
Expatriate footballers in Spain
Rocha F.C. managers